Philippe Tourtelier (born July 29, 1948 in Saffré) was a member of the National Assembly of France.  He represented Ille-et-Vilaine's 2nd constituency from 2002 to 2012 as a member of the Socialiste, radical, citoyen et divers gauche.

References

1948 births
Living people
People from Loire-Atlantique
Politicians from Pays de la Loire
Mayors of places in Brittany
Socialist Party (France) politicians
Deputies of the 12th National Assembly of the French Fifth Republic
Deputies of the 13th National Assembly of the French Fifth Republic
Knights of the Ordre national du Mérite